Navarre is an unincorporated community in Dickinson County, Kansas, United States.  As of the 2020 census, the population of the city was 52.

History
In 1887, Atchison, Topeka and Santa Fe Railway built a branch line from Neva (3 miles west of Strong City) through Navarre to Superior, Nebraska.  In 1996, the Atchison, Topeka and Santa Fe Railway merged with Burlington Northern Railroad and renamed to the current BNSF Railway.  Most locals still refer to this railroad as the "Santa Fe".

The post office was established February 7, 1884, and discontinued September 3, 1971.

The Navarre Church of the Brethren was organized in 1869 and held its last "Homecoming Service" in August 2001, after which the church bell was donated to the Navarre cemetery.

Demographics

For statistical purposes, the United States Census Bureau has defined this community as a census-designated place (CDP).

Education
The community is served by Chapman USD 473 public school district.

References

Further reading
 List of books about Dickinson County

External links
 Historic Images of Navarre, Special Photo Collections at Wichita State University Library
 Dickinson County maps: Current, Historic, KDOT

Populated places established in 1884
Unincorporated communities in Kansas
Unincorporated communities in Dickinson County, Kansas
1884 establishments in Kansas